RPM was a Canadian magazine that published the best-performing singles of Canada from 1964 to 2000. Eighteen different songs rose to number one this year, starting with "Head over Feet" by Alanis Morissette and ending with "Tubthumping" by Chumbawamba. Ten artists reached the top spot for the first time in 1997: Merril Bainbridge, OMC, No Doubt, The Wallflowers, Savage Garden, Our Lady Peace, Hanson, Sarah McLachlan, Sugar Ray, and Chumbawamba. This year, no artist achieved more than one number-one single.

Two songs spent eight weeks at number one in 1997: "Building a Mystery" by Sarah McLachlan and "Tubthumping" by Chumbawamba; the former song was the year's best-performing single. The Rolling Stones earned their ninth number-one single in 1997 with "Anybody Seen My Baby?", having first topped the RPM Singles Chart in November 1965 with "Get Off of My Cloud"; this gave them a 31-year, 11-month spread of number-one hits in Canada.

Alanis Morissette, Our Lady Peace, and Sarah McLachlan were the only Canadian acts to reach number one in their home country this year. American band The Wallflowers stayed at number one for five weeks with "One Headlight", and four acts totalled three weeks at the summit: Sheryl Crow, INXS, Hanson, and Sugar Ray.

Chart history

Notes

See also
1997 in music

List of Billboard Hot 100 number ones of 1997 (United States)
List of number-one singles from the 1990s (New Zealand)

References

External links
 RPM Magazine at the AV Trust
 RPM chart search at Library and Archives Canada

 
1997 record charts
1997